Hall of Fame OTO Award

Currently held by  Božidara Turzonovová

First awarded  | Last awarded 2000 | Present 

Hall of Fame OTO Award has been annually presented at the OTO Awards ceremony for lifetime achievements. Since 2000, the honor is given by the Academy of Personalities of Culture and Social Life in Slovakia.

Honorees

2000s

2010s

 Notes
Ψ Denotes also a winner in one of the main categories.

References

External links
 OTO Awards  (Official website)
 OTO Awards - Winners and nominees  (From 2000 onwards)
 OTO Awards - Winners and nominees (From 2000 to 2009)
 Hall of Fame OTO - Winners at Nový čas

OTO Awards
Awards established in 2000
Halls of fame in Slovakia
Entertainment halls of fame